Electrified Funk is the second studio album by the funk rock band Wild Cherry, released in 1977. It contains "Baby Don't You Know", the soundalike follow-up to their 1976 hit "Play That Funky Music". It also contains a repeat of a song from the first album, "Hold On (With Strings)", this time with added violins.

Track listing
All tracks composed by Rob Parissi; except where indicated
"Baby Don't You Know"
"Are You Boogieing Around on Your Daddy"
"Dancin' Music Band"
"Put Yourself in My Shoes"
"Closest Thing to My Mind"
"Electrified Funk"
"Hole in the Wall"
"Hot to Trot"
"Hold On (With Strings)"
"It's All Up to You" (Alvin Fields, Michael Zager)

Personnel
Robert Parissi - lead guitar, lead vocals
Allen Wentz - bass guitar, synthesizer, vocals
Ronald Beitle - drums, vocals
Mark Avsec - keyboards
Bryan Bassett - lead guitar, vocals

References

1977 albums
Wild Cherry (band) albums
Epic Records albums